Bożacin refers to the following places in Poland:

 Bożacin, Greater Poland Voivodeship
 Bożacin, Kuyavian-Pomeranian Voivodeship